The End of the Party: The Rise and Fall of New Labour is a book by political journalist Andrew Rawnsley detailing the centre-left New Labour Premiership of Tony Blair between 2001, when Blair was re-elected as Prime Minister of the United Kingdom, through to his resignation in 2007 when Gordon Brown formed his government, and through to just before Labour's defeat in 2010.

References

2010 non-fiction books
2010 in British politics
Books about politics of the United Kingdom
Gordon Brown
Labour Party (UK) publications
Tony Blair
New Labour